19 was a Japanese pop/folk duo.  Its members were
Kenji Okahira and Keigo Iwase. The group broke up in March 2002.  Kenji is now a member of the band 3B LAB.☆.

Discography

Singles
 'Ano Ao wo Koete' (21 November 1998)
 'Ano Kamihikoki Kumori-zora Watte' (20 March 1999)
 'Subete he ' (21 October 1999)
 'Hate no nai Michi' (21 April 2000)
 'Sui Riku Sora, Mugendai' (5 July 2000)
 'Haikei Roman' (29 November 2000)
 'Ashiato' (25 April 2001)
 'Taisetsuna Hito' (22 August 2001)
 'Tanpopo' (21 March 2002)

Albums
 Ongaku (23 July 1999)
 Mugendai (26 July 2000)
 up to you (27 September 2001)
 19 BEST Haru (27 April 2002)
 19 BEST Ao (27 April 2002)
 19 BEST LIVE Audio use only (24 July 2002)

Video
 Seireki Zenshin 2000nen "Daibakusin Eizo!" (23 March 2000)
 19 LAST LIVE TV use only (24 July 2002)
 19 VIDEO CLIPS 1>9 (21 August 2002)

DVD
 Seireki Zenshin 2000nen "Daibakushin Eizo!" (6 December 2000)
 19 LAST LIVE TV use only (24 July 2002)
 19 VIDEO CLIPS 1>9 (21 August 2002)

External links
 19 BOX - The official website

Japanese pop music groups
Musical groups established in 1998
1998 establishments in Japan
Musical groups disestablished in 2002
2002 disestablishments in Japan
Musical groups from Hiroshima Prefecture
Pop-folk music groups